The Edith Chipman House is a historic house located at 201 West 3rd Street in Vermont, Illinois. Edith Chipman, the widow of a wealthy local farmer and lumber seller, had the house built in 1912. The house had a four-over-four plan, typified by four equally sized rooms and a central hallway on both of its two stories, with American Foursquare exterior features and Classical Revival details. The house's cubelike shape and its hip roof with hipped dormers are typical of American Foursquare homes, though the interior plan is not typical of Foursquare architecture. Its Classical Revival elements include the Tuscan columns supporting the porch, the entablatures on the inside of the doors and windows, and the staircase's balusters and newel posts.

The house was added to the National Register of Historic Places on November 7, 1996.

References

Houses on the National Register of Historic Places in Illinois
Houses completed in 1912
American Foursquare architecture in Illinois
National Register of Historic Places in Fulton County, Illinois
Vermont, Illinois